The Indian Brothers is a 1911 American short silent drama film directed by D. W. Griffith, starring Frank Opperman and featuring Blanche Sweet.

Cast
 Frank Opperman as The Indian Chief
 Wilfred Lucas as The Indian Chief's Brother
 Guy Hedlund as The Renegade
 John T. Dillon as At Funeral (as Jack Dillon)
 Francis J. Grandon as Indian
 Florence La Badie
 Alfred Paget as In Second Tribe / At Funeral
 W. C. Robinson as In Second Tribe
 Blanche Sweet as Indian
 Kate Toncray as Indian
 Charles West as At Funeral (as Charles H. West)

See also
 D. W. Griffith filmography
 Blanche Sweet filmography

References

External links

1911 films
American black-and-white films
1911 drama films
Films directed by D. W. Griffith
1911 short films
American silent short films
Silent American drama films
1910s American films